Cody Anderson may refer to:
Cody Anderson (born 1990), MLB pitcher
Cody Anderson, In Fear and Faith band member
Cody Anderson, a character in the Total Drama series

See also
Anderson (surname)